Lone Star Geyser is a cone type geyser located in the Lone Star Geyser Basin of Yellowstone National Park. The geyser is reached via an old service road open to hikers and biking with the trailhead near Kepler Cascades on the Grand Loop Road.

History
Aubrey L. Haines, the Yellowstone park historian from 1960 to 1969, relates three stories as to how this geyser was named:
 In 1882, two Northern Pacific Railroad surveyors working in the Upper Geyser Basin region came upon the geyser and assumed because of its remote location that they were the first to discover it. They named it Lone Star Geyser in their notes.
 In 1879, Colonel W. D. Pickett and J.M.V. Cochran, two hunters who had camped near Old Faithful, referred to the geyser as Lone Star during a discussion they had with Henry Bird Calfee, a noted Yellowstone photographer, during a later part of their hunting trip.
 The Hayden Geological Survey of 1872 named this geyser Solitary Geyser but that name was later given to another geyser northeast of Old Faithful.

References

Geothermal features of Yellowstone National Park
Geysers of Wyoming
Geothermal features of Teton County, Wyoming
Geysers of Teton County, Wyoming
Articles containing video clips